The article lists British Army reserve brigades in the First World War. At the start of the war, British Army volunteers in the vast majority of cases joined their local infantry regiments reserve battalion.

In 1916 when conscription was first introduced for the British Army, the existing regimental system could not cope with the large influx of recruits. By January 1916, when conscription was introduced, 2.6 million men had already volunteered for service, a further 2.3 million were conscripted before the end of the war; by the end of 1918, the army had reached its peak strength of four million men. To train the recruits from 1916 onwards twenty-six reserve brigades were raised, with an official complement of over 208,500 soldiers.

Background

In August 1914, 300,000 men had signed up to fight, and another 450,000 had joined-up by the end of September. Recruitment remained fairly steady through 1914 and early 1915, but it fell dramatically during the later years, especially after the Somme campaign, which resulted in 360,000 casualties. A prominent feature of the early months of volunteering was the formation of Pals battalions. Many of these pals who had lived and worked together, joined up and trained together and were allocated to the same units. The policy of drawing recruits from amongst the local population ensured that, when the Pals battalions suffered casualties, whole towns, villages, neighbourhoods and communities back in Britain were to suffer disproportionate losses. With the introduction of conscription in January 1916, no further Pals battalions were raised. Conscription for single men was introduced in January 1916. Four months later, in May 1916, it was extended to all men aged 18 to 41. The Military Service Act March 1916 specified that men from the ages of 18 to 41 were liable to be called up for service in the army, unless they were married (or widowed with children), or served in one of a number of reserved occupations, which were usually industrial but which also included clergymen and teachers. This legislation did not apply to Ireland, despite its then status as part of the United Kingdom (but see Conscription Crisis of 1918). By January 1916, when conscription was introduced, 2.6 million men had volunteered for service, a further 2.3 million were conscripted before the end of the war; by the end of 1918, the army had reached its peak strength of four million men.

Reserve brigades

At the start of the First World War, most British Army infantry regiments had their own reserve battalions. After conscription was introduced from 1 September 1916 onwards, the reserve infantry battalions were reorganised. The previous regimental system simply could not cope with the influx of recruits and a centralised training and reserve system was introduced.

The reserve battalions still kept their regimental affiliations, cap badges and accoutrements, until 1 September 1916, when the regimental distinctions disappeared and the battalions were re-designated as the 1st to 116th reserve battalion in one of 26 reserve brigades. The Training Reserve had an official complement of 208,500 soldiers.

A development of the scheme was designating of 14 of the battalions as "Young Soldier Battalions". When a recruit had finished training in the Young Soldier Battalion he was sent to one of two associated "Graduated Battalions", in which the four companies were organised by age, 3 monthly steps between 18 and 19 years. As a result, every 3 months, 28 companies of newly trained soldiers were ready for drafting to France. In October 1917 some of the Graduated Battalions were found suitable for Home Service and re-designated with battalion numbers from the 201st upwards.

Another consequence of the centralised training system was that when recruits were posted to a battalion on active service, they would be sent to where there was a vacancy and not their local regiment. This system lasted until May 1917, when the reserve battalions were once again affiliated with a particular regiment and became known as graduated or young soldier battalions of their regiment.

List of brigades

See also
British Army during World War I
British infantry brigades of the First World War

References

Bibliography
Chandler, Malcolm (2001). The Home Front, 1914–18. Heinemann. .
Tucker, Spencer; Roberts, Priscilla Mary (2005). World War I: encyclopedia. ABC-CLIO. .
Ward, S G P (1962) Faithful: The Storey of the Durham Light Infantry. Naval and Military Press. 

British Army recruitment